The Saint Anne Parish and Diocesan Shrine, also known as Saint Anne Parish, is a Roman Catholic Church located in Silangang Malicboy in the municipality of Pagbilao, Quezon, Philippines. The parish's patroness is Saint Anne.

History

The Grupo 
In the year 1908 started the Grupo of their annual feast. The first Ermita measured 6m x 10m, was built on the land of Silverio Merluza.

At present, it is owned by Dolores Villasenor VDA. De Guevarra, in the care of Nena Bendico. It is on the right side of the old road, built near the former elementary school. The school (Malicboy Elementary School) was made a Japanese garrison. According to the people of Crossing, adjacent to the former hermitage was built a tomb for the people killed by Japanese soldiers including three nuns in white.

The Grupo, led by Pio Dimalaluan and Enrique Glorioso agreed to seek the help of Lino Castro, who is from the town proper, Pagbilao and owner of the farm cultivated by Pio. Lino was the one who would invite a priest to say mass for their fiesta. Father and daughter Lino and Ana then arranged that the fiesta mass on their farm be held on Ana's birthday which is July 26. On that day Ana Castro brought the picture of her patron saint; St. Anne. From then on, Ana brought the picture every year until she had it enshrined in the ermita under the care of Pio.

The Grupo is an organization of males in Malicboy.

•Grupo ng Crossing – Enrique Glorioso, Boris Tiay and Felicisimo Tiay

•Grupo ng Sapinit – Pio Dimalaluan, Cipriano Ayala, Catalino “Tog-ok” Catausan, and Miguel Merjudio

Lorenzo Salazar, a guy from Tuguegarao, Cagayan, left Malicboy on start the WWII, carrying the image of Sta. Ana.

1926 
A strong storm hit the village in 1926 and destroyed the Ermita.

World War II 
In 1937, before World War II, the elected Barrio Captain: Vicente Batilo, together with his constituents, built a new ermita on top of a hill owned by Severina Luna (mother of the Ayala clan) to make it nearer to the community.  The land is now owned by the Lukang family. People started building new houses around the then newly constructed train station. A contest in the barrio was conducted, and was used as fund raising to build the Hermitage. One of the candidates was Mrs. Carmen Abrigo. There are no other images in the new Ermita but the Holy cross. Consequently, the Hermitage was adorned by flowers made of paper, there was always a reminder: "ito ay "Simbahan", Hindi sayawan"(this is "Church", not a place for dancing). Fr. Francisco Ayala, priest from Pagbilao, presided over the masses held there. He was assignment in Macalelon, but returned to Pagbilao because of the war.

During these times, Ana hired an artist from Lucban, Lucilo Empamano, who decorated the ermita every year during the fiesta, to adorn the Hermitage. He made an  image of patroness by dressing a statue of the Blessed Virgin Mary, before it was called Mediatrix of All Graces, in a red cloth.

“Si Lucilo Empamano ay taga Lucban, walang asawa, at medyo malambot kung kumilos, siya ay isang pintor.”

-Interview with Vicente & Natalia Ayala (February 20, 2007)

The image of Sta. Ana was clothed by Ana Castro every feast. It is clothed in a White cloth with a Blue cape. (according to Carmen Abprigo). Because of the WWII, the vicinity of the Ermita was used as a Cemetery. 13-17 are known to be buried here  currently, yet, only 6 were named. They are: Arcelita Ayala, Amando (Andoy) Florantes, Jesus de Espiritu Santo, Simfro Batilo, Eleonor Catausan and Rodencio Catausan. Until such time that the structure was destroyed by termites, Malicboy had no permanent church. For quite a long time, the yearly mass celebrations was held under a temporary bamboo frame erected wherever they could arrange for space.

Angel Glorioso and the New Ermita 
Another Ermita was built in land of Marquez (Sitio Magsaysay). Fr. Diogracias Medrano presided the masses held there. But it was again damaged only after a year. Later, on a lot inherited by Angel Glorioso from his father Enrique, a new wooden ermita with tin roof was built. This area used to be situated behind the houses and a warehouse owned by a Chinese businessman.

In 1948, in Lipa, Batangas,   the Blessed Virgin Mary was announced as the Mediatrix of All Graces.

Single St. Anne Image 
The couple Angel and Canding (Catapat) went on to have the ermita built. The structure was made sturdy with wooden walls. In April of that year, a stranger had his car broke down near the railroad crossing which is near the couple's house. The occupants are from Pampanga and were selling Christ the King images. The strangers stayed in the couple's house for the night. By next day, an order was placed for an image of St. Anne based on the picture left behind by Ana Castro-Martinez. In May of that year, the new image was delivered. The image did not have an infant Mary yet because the picture on which it was based from could be representing the time that St. Anne is still single.

With the image of St. Anne, the people were inspired to improve the ermita. Many contributed wooden planks for the walls. Dr. Rafael Borja donated the lacking wooden planks to have the walls completed in time for the fiesta of 1952.

The First Parish Church 
In 1952, the first parish church of Sta. Ana was built, through the command of Bishop Alfredo Ma. Obviar, D.D, the first Bishop of Lucena, the scope of 5 Barangays: Binahaan, Ilaya and Ibabang Polo, & Silangan and Kanlurang Malicboy. From then on, the parish improved with a convent built in 1959. Also, the lot was elevated to avoid getting flooded.

The Request 
A few months after the fiesta of 1957, with advise from Rev. Fr. Vicente Urlanda, the people requested from Most Rev. Bishop Alfredo Ma. Obviar for St. Anne Church to have their own priest. The first religious procession was held led by the parochial vicar of Pagbilao, Fr. Severino Salvania, who organized a mass and baptism. The Glorioso couple soon donated their lot to the future parish priest, Fr. Vicente Urlanda, Curate of Pagbilao, presented to bishop Obviar, the petition of the people for a regular priest.

Bigger, Sturdier 
On 2 July 1960, the corner stone was laid for the new parish church. As years passed, the construction was continuing and the parish was able to acquire adjacent lots with generous help from parishioners. A bigger and sturdier church, furnished with a marble altar, was built.

July 25, 1983 
The church was completed and blessed on 25 July 1983.

Increase of Devotees 

With the increase of parishioners, including devotees and pilgrims from other areas, the church renovation started in 1993.

May 1, 1994 
The ground breaking of the site of St. Joaquin Evangelization Hall was held through the initiative of the parish priest and the PPC President; Efren Mercurio. The hall's construction was realized thru the pledges of the parishioners.

September 11, 1994 
The Blessed Sacrament Chapel as first structure being finished ahead of the main church was blessed by Most Rev. Ruben T. Profugo in the presence of the parishioners and the sponsors led by Fr. Charles Herrera, Parish Priest and Ernie Doblon, PCEA President.

The Lupi 
The so-called "Lupi" which means one(1) set of (9) consecutive Tuesdays novena in honor of St. Anne was officially introduced to the devotees by the Parish Priest. The first Lupi was dated November 30, 1999 to January 25, 2000.

St. Anne Church As A Pilgrim Church of Lucena 
Before it was declared as a Diocesan Shrine, St. Anne Church was declared as a "JUBILEE PILGRIM CHURCH OF LUCENA" by Bishop Ruben T. Profugo.

February 4, 2000 
Msgr. Froilan Zalameda, P.C., former parish priest of St. Anne (1976–1983) officiated the ceremonial blessing of St. Anne Candle Park at the left wing of the church.

The Surprise 
The church, together with the Evangelization Hall, candle stands, comfort rooms, fencing, patio and priest's residence, was blessed and consecrated by Bishop Ruben T. Profugo, at the end of the Mass, the parishioners surprised when declared by order of Bishop Ruben T. Profugo, read by Fr. Erwin Aguilar, Vice-Chancellor, the proclamation of St. Anne Church as a Diocesan Shrine.

November 4, 2001 
The groundbreaking ceremony of the site of the proposed St. Anne's Belfry took place through the initiative of the PCEA headed by Teodoro M. Gatchalian, President.

November 4, 2002 
A baptistry was installed and blessed by the Most Rev. Emilio Z. Marquez D.D.

The Relic of St. Anne 
The Relic of St. Anne that was given by the Vatican arrived on July 11, 2004.

The 3 Relics
On September 5, 2007, the 3 relics of St. Monica, St. Anthony of Padua, and St. Francis of Assisi arrived on the church through the effort of Rev. Fr. Raphael V. Tolentino.

September 9, 2008 
The 4th relic; the relic of St. John Ma. Vianney arrived.

Her 50th Anniversary 
On 15 March 2008, the St. Anne Parish, under parish priest Rev. Fr. Raphael V. Tolentino, celebrated its 50th anniversary as a parish. The guest of honor was no less than the President of the Republic of the Philippines; Gloria Macapagal Arroyo. It is a very rare and unusual occasion that the President would grace an event like this.

Present 
The current parish priest of St. Anne Parish & Diocesan Shrine is Rev. Fr. Joseph T. Estremera. He proposed for the renovation of the Baptistry and St. Anne's Candle Park and Garden, and was rededicated and blessed on April 28, 2016.

On July 15 of each year, the St. Anne Parish celebrates its Anniversary as a Diocesan Shrine, conducting numerous events. One of those events is the "Sayaw Parangal Para Kay Sta. Ana", a street dancing performed on the streets of  Malicboy in honor of St. Anne. Many colorful costumes are worn by the participating dancers from across different MSKs and Sitios, filling the whole streets of Malicboy with color and music. And, during July 26, the feast of St. Anne is celebrated filled with different events.

Devotion 
The devotion to St. Anne is on Tuesday. It is believed that according to the old tradition, St. Anne was born and died on Tuesday. Because of this, the belief and devotion to St. Anne, the grandmother of Jesus on Tuesday, spread throughout Christianity. (Gerard Desrochers, C., Ss., R., Sainte Anne's Prayer Book, pp. 18–19)

Mass Schedule on Tuesdays 

5:45 AM    Novena Mass

10:45 AM    Novena Mass

 3:00 PM    Holy Hour

5:00 PM    Novena Mass

Sunday Mass Schedule

7:15 AM    Mass

5:00 PM    Mass

Monday, Wednesday, Thursday, Friday & Saturday Mass Schedules

6:00 AM    Mass

1st Saturday

4:30 AM Dawn Rosary Procession

Features 
Also known as "The Shrine of MSKs", it is considered to be locally known as the Smallest Parish Shrine in the Philippines.

Facade 

The Stained glass in the front of the church symbolizes the motherhood of St. Anne to Mary, and to the whole of Malicboy.

Candle Park And Garden 
Was constructed in the year 2000, the Candle Park and Garden is one of the places of meditation for the devotees and parishioners of St. Anne. People may light their candles and wish to St. Anne. There are different sites for meditation in the garden, which includes the site for the sick people, people who want to have children, etc.

Administration 
St. Anne Parish and Diocesan Shrine is in the jurisdiction of the Vicariate of St. Andrew in the District of St. Matthew of the Diocese of Lucena. Rev. Fr. Joseph T. Estremera, serves as parish priest he is parish priest from National Shrine of Our Lady of Sorrows Parish in Dolores, Quezon from 2009 to 2015.

Bibliography 

Roman Catholic churches in Quezon